The Montana Veterans and Pioneers Memorial Building, at 225 North Roberts in Helena, Montana is the Modern Movement-style headquarters of the Montana Historical Society.  It was built in 1953 and was listed on the National Register of Historic Places in 2004.

The design of Great Falls architect Angus Vaughn McIver won the architectural design contest.  It was built by Carson Construction Company.

References

National Register of Historic Places in Helena, Montana
Buildings and structures completed in 1953
1953 establishments in Montana
Modern Movement architecture in the United States
History museums in Montana